Cameron Dodson (July 28, 1988 - December 19, 2021) was an American professional USAC Silver Crown and stock car racing driver. Dodson won the 2007 USAC Silver Crown Rookie of the Year award, and competed in four Truck races in 2006. He last competed part-time in the NASCAR Craftsman Truck Series, driving the No. 63 for MB Motorsports.

On December 19, 2021, Dodson was hit by a car while crossing the street and killed instantly.

Motorsports career results

NASCAR
(key) (Bold – Pole position awarded by qualifying time. Italics – Pole position earned by points standings or practice time. * – Most laps led.)

Craftsman Truck Series

References

External links
 

1988 births
2021 deaths
NASCAR drivers
CARS Tour drivers
People from Greenfield, Indiana
Racing drivers from Indiana